This is a list of official football games played by Saudi Arabia national football team between 2000 and 2009.

2000

2001

2002

2003

2004

2005

2006

2007

2008

2009

Statistics

Results by year

As of 2009

Opponents

Notes

References

External links 
Saudi Arabia. National football team

2000
2000s in Saudi Arabian sport